The Stillwater River is a  tributary of the Great Miami River in western Ohio in the United States.  Via the Great Miami and Ohio rivers, it is part of the Mississippi River watershed.

It flows south past Covington and Englewood, where it is dammed for flood control, then southeast to join the Great Miami River in Dayton.

Stillwater River was so named on account of its relatively slow current. The Stillwater River was one of the Great Miami River tributaries that flooded during the Great Dayton Flood of 1913, resulting in the creation of the Miami Conservancy District.

Variant names
According to the Geographic Names Information System, the Stillwater River has also been known as:
 Jacobs Lateral 	
 Southwest Branch 	
 Stillwater Creek

See also
List of rivers of Ohio

References 

Rivers of Ohio
Rivers of Darke County, Ohio
Rivers of Miami County, Ohio
Rivers of Montgomery County, Ohio